Paraphelenchus is a genus of nematodes belonging to the family Aphelenchidae.

The species of this genus are found in Europe and Africa.

Species:

Paraphelenchus amblyurus 
Paraphelenchus batavicus 
Paraphelenchus myceliophthorus 
Paraphelenchus pseudoparietinus 
Paraphelenchus tritici 
Paraphelenchus zichii

References

Nematodes